An accomplice is a person who actively participates in the commission of a crime but takes no part in the actual criminal offense.

Accomplice may also refer to:

 Accomplice (film), a 1946 film noir
 The Accomplice (1917 film), an American silent drama film
 The Accomplice (1932 film), a French film
 "The Accomplice" (The O.C.), an episode of The O.C.
 "The Accomplice" (The Zeta Project), an episode of The Zeta Project
 The Accomplices, a 2007 play by Bernard Weintraub
 Accomplice, a band fronted by Johnny Gioeli
 Accomplices (film), a 2009 film
 The Accomplice (TV series), a 2020 Iranian series starring Parviz Parastui

See also 
 "Complice" ("Accomplice"), a 2008 song by Miodio